Henry Line was Archdeacon of Waterford from 1913 until 1937.

Line was educated at Trinity College, Dublin and ordained in 1880. He served at Kilrossanty and Waterford (curacies); Ballinakill and Dunmore East (incumbencies). He was Chancellor of Waterford from 1896 until 1913.

Notes

Alumni of Trinity College Dublin
Archdeacons of Waterford
19th-century Irish Anglican priests
20th-century Irish Anglican priests